The Harrad Experiment is a 1973 coming-of-age film about a fictional school called Harrad College where the students learn about sexuality and experiment with each other.  Based on the 1966 novel of the same name by Robert Rimmer, this film deals with the concept of free love during the height of the sexual revolution, which took place in the United States during the late 1960s and early 1970s.

The movie stars James Whitmore and Tippi Hedren as the married couple who run the school, and includes a young Don Johnson (who later became Hedren's son-in-law) as one of the students who tries to go beyond the rules. It was directed by Ted Post.The screenplay was co-written by Ted Cassidy and Michael Werner based upon Rimmer's novel.
A sequel, Harrad Summer, was released in 1974.

Plot

Cast
 James Whitmore as Philip Tenhausen
 Tippi Hedren as Margaret Tenhausen
 Don Johnson as Stanley Cole
 Bruno Kirby as Harry Schacht (as B. Kirby Jr.)
 Laurie Walters as Sheila Grove
 Victoria Thompson as Beth Hillyer
 Elliott Street as Wilson
 Robert Middleton as Sidney Bower
 Billy Sands as Jack
 Sharon Ullrick (née Taggart) as Barbara
 Maggie Wellman as Cynthia
 Michael Greene as Yoga Instructor
 Ron Kolman as Evan
 Eric Server as Workman
 Robert C. Ross as Workman

Additional cast
(all uncredited)
 Ted Cassidy as the diner patron
 Gregory Harrison as a student
 Melody Patterson as Jeannie
 Dennis F. Stevens as the heckler at the Ice House
 Ace Trucking Company employees:
 George Memmoli
 Michael Mislove
 Mary Elaine Monti
 Bill Saluga
 Fred Willard
 Melanie Griffith as an extra

Home video
The film was released on DVD on May 22, 2001 by Marengo Films.

Reception
Time Out said that while Post had employed long, "voyeuristic" takes and the theme music was poor, the film had more appeal than his other work and deserved its success.

See also
 List of American films of 1974
 List of American films of 1973

References

External links

1973 films
1973 drama films
1970s American films
1970s English-language films
1970s teen films
American drama films
Cinerama Releasing Corporation films
Films about educators
Films based on American novels
Films directed by Ted Post
Films set in Massachusetts
Films set in universities and colleges